KBVU (channel 28) is a television station in Eureka, California, United States, affiliated with the Fox network. It is owned by Cunningham Broadcasting, which maintains a local marketing agreement (LMA) with the Sinclair Broadcast Group, owner of Arcata-licensed ABC affiliate KAEF-TV (channel 23), for the provision of certain services. However, Sinclair effectively owns KBVU as the majority of Cunningham's stock is owned by the family of deceased group founder Julian Smith. KBVU is also sister to two low-power stations owned by Sinclair: dual CW/MyNetworkTV affiliate KECA-LD (channel 29) and Univision affiliate KEUV-LD (channel 35). The stations share studios on Sixth Street in downtown Eureka, while KBVU's transmitter is located along Barry Road southeast of Eureka.

Although it identifies as a station in its own right, KBVU is considered a semi-satellite of KCVU (channel 20) in Paradise–Chico–Redding. As such, it clears all network programming as provided through its parent station but airs a separate offering of syndicated programming; there are also separate local newscasts, commercial inserts and legal station identifications. Master control and most internal operations are based at the shared studios of KCVU and LMA partner KRCR-TV on Auditorium Drive in Redding.

History
The station signed on the air as a Fox affiliate on July 20, 1994. Prior to KBVU's launch, Fox's programming was only available via a secondary affiliation with ABC affiliates KAEF and KFWU (both satellites of KRCR-TV), while out-of-market affiliates KTVU and KTXL were imported by some cable providers.

On April 21, 2017, Sinclair Broadcast Group purchased KBVU as part of a four-station deal. The sale was completed on September 1.

Newscasts
KBVU currently airs 2½ hours of newscasts each week, all on weeknights at 10 p.m., as North Coast News on KBVU Fox 28 at 10. The newscasts are produced by sister station KAEF.

Technical information

Subchannels
The station's digital signal is multiplexed:

Analog-to-digital conversion
KBVU shut down its analog signal, over UHF channel 29, on December 22, 2008, along with KCVU, due to financial hardship. The station's digital signal broadcasts on its pre-transition UHF channel 28.

References

External links

Fox network affiliates
Comet (TV network) affiliates
Charge! (TV network) affiliates
Stadium (sports network) affiliates
Television channels and stations established in 1994
1994 establishments in California
BVU (TV)
Sinclair Broadcast Group